Otterburn is a small village in Northumberland, England,  northwest of Newcastle upon Tyne on the banks of the River Rede, near the confluence of the Otter Burn, from which the village derives its name. The parish of Otterburn is at the heart of Redesdale, a Northumbrian upland valley.

History 
The name simply means otter stream, a stream frequented by otters (Old English  + ). Otterburn was the site of a major battle in 1388 between English and Scottish armies. The engagement, in which the Scots took Sir Henry Percy captive, is the subject of the English Ballad of Chevy Chase and the Scots ballad Otterburn.

The battle of Otterburn ended in an English rout. Despite James Douglas, 2nd Earl of Douglas being killed, Percy was captured and over a thousand of the English were taken, left dead on the field or slain as they fled. The dead were carried to Elsdon church,  from Otterburn, where they were buried.

The modern village grew up around a coaching inn and Otterburn Tower. It was enlarged in the 1950s with the addition of Brierley Gardens, a council estate which was expanded in the 1970s. The village further expanded in the 1990s and 2000s with the new housing development on former farm land at Willow Green.

Governance
Otterburn is in the parliamentary constituency of Hexham, Guy Opperman of the Conservative Party is the Member of Parliament.

Prior to Brexit, for the European Parliament its residents voted to elect MEP's for the North East England constituency.

For Local Government purposes it belongs to Northumberland County Council a unitary authority.

Economy 
The village also has an independent general grocery shop, two hotels and Otterburn Mill, an 18th-century woollen mill containing a small museum, outdoor shop and cafe.

Landmarks 
 Otterburn Hall, now a hotel, is a Neo-Elizabethan structure, built in 1870 for Lord James Douglas, and which is now currently shut.
 St John the Evangelist's Church, Otterburn
 Otterburn Mill is now a retail outlet and cafe.
 Otterburn Tower, changed name to Otterburn Castle, now a hotel, was built in 1830 incorporating part of an eighteenth-century house, which itself may have incorporated the thirteenth-century tower house which originally stood on the site.
 The "Percy Cross" stands within a small plantation, half a mile north of the village. Near this spot, on an August evening in 1388, an English army of 8,000 men followed Sir Henry Percy into battle against the Scots, led by James Douglas, 2nd Earl of Douglas.

References

External links

 http://www.parish-council.com/Otterburn/index.asp

 
Villages in Northumberland
Civil parishes in Northumberland